Martino Fill (born 5 March 1939) is an Italian alpine skier. He competed in two events at the 1964 Winter Olympics.

References

External links
 

1939 births
Living people
Italian male alpine skiers
Olympic alpine skiers of Italy
Alpine skiers at the 1964 Winter Olympics
People from Kastelruth
Sportspeople from Südtirol